Georgiyevskoye is a rural locality (a selo) in Sergiyevskoye Rural Settlement of Giaginsky District, Adygea, Russia. The population was 238 as of 2018. There are 5 streets.

Geography 
Georgiyevskoye is located 42 km southeast of Giaginskaya (the district's administrative centre) by road. Tambovsky is the nearest rural locality.

Ethnicity 
The village is inhabited by Russians, Armenians and Chuvashes.

References 

Rural localities in Giaginsky District